Kasam Vardi Kee is a 1989 Hindi-language action film, produced by  B.S. Shaad, Jimmy Narula on BRAR Combines banner and directed by Shibu Mitra. Starring Jeetendra, Bhanupriya, Chunky Pandey, Farah and music composed by Bappi Lahiri.

Plot
Inspector Vijay Singh (Jeetendra) a sheer Police Officer who swears by his uniform that he would be honest in his duty towards the people & the nation and function within the periphery of law. Vijay is in love with a beautiful girl Aarti (Bhanupriya). Ajay Singh (Chunky Pandey), his younger brother is a college-going happy guy, who is in love with Pooja (Farah). Ajay thinks that loopholes and flaws in the law are actually manipulative. Vijay always gives tough fight to Minister Parshuram (Vikram Gokhale), his son Vicky (Raj Kiran) along with their partners Chadda (Anupam Kher), Janardan (Kiran Kumar) & his brother Babla (Raza Murad) who are the real antisocial elements to the society but showcases themselves as well-respected people. Vijay is on the verge of busting their reality but they hatched him into a crime in the course of duty and he is sentenced. Ajay comes to meet his brother in prison and asks for the details of the people who have implemented him in the case but Vijay refuses to divulge and takes a promise to join him in Police. The remaining story is whether Ajay proves his brother as innocent or not?

Cast

 Jeetendra as Inspector Vijay Singh
 Bhanupriya as Aarti
 Chunky Pandey as Inspector Ajay Singh
 Farah as Pooja
 Raj Kiran as Vicky
 Raza Murad as Babla
 Kiran Kumar as Janardan
 Anupam Kher as Chadda 
 Vikram Gokhale as Minister Parshuram
 Tej Sapru as Inspector Rakesh Mehra
 Viju Khote as Constable Chiranjeet
 Om Shivpuri as Police Commissioner
 Satish Kaul

Soundtrack
Lyrics: Anjaan

References

External links

1980s Hindi-language films
1989 films
Films scored by Bappi Lahiri
Films directed by Shibu Mitra